Cameron Elijah Reddish (born September 1, 1999) is an American professional basketball player for the Portland Trail Blazers of the National Basketball Association (NBA). He played college basketball for the Duke Blue Devils. He was selected 10th overall by the Atlanta Hawks in the first round of the 2019 NBA draft.

Coming out of high school, Reddish was rated as a five-star recruit and considered one of the top players in his class, earning Mr. Pennsylvania Basketball in his senior year, in addition to being named to the 2018 McDonald's All-American Boys Game, 2018 Jordan Brand Classic and 2018 Nike Hoop Summit.

High school career
Reddish attended The Haverford School in Haverford, Pennsylvania, as a freshman before transferring to Westtown School in West Chester, Pennsylvania, where he teamed up with Class of 2017 five-star recruit and current NBA player Mohamed Bamba. As a junior, Reddish averaged 16.2 points per game and led the Moose to a Friend's School League title. During the summer of 2017, Reddish averaged 23.8 points, 7.6 rebounds and 3.1 assists for his Amateur Athletic Union (AAU) team, Team Final, on the Nike EYBL Circuit. Later that summer, he played for the United States men's national under-19 basketball team. He was originally going to play for the under-17 team the previous summer, but did not make the team due to injury. In his senior year, he averaged 22.6 points and 5.6 rebounds per game. After his senior season, he was named 2018 Mr. Pennsylvania Basketball. Reddish was selected to play in the 2018 McDonald's All-American Game,  Jordan Brand Classic, and Nike Hoop Summit All-Star games.

Recruiting
Reddish was a five-star recruit. He was ranked the third-best player in the 2018 class by 247Sports and the third-best recruit in the class of 2018 by ESPN. On September 1, 2017, Reddish committed to Duke University, joined by fellow top-3 recruits RJ Barrett and Zion Williamson.

College career

On November 6, 2018 In his Duke debut, Reddish scored 22 points in a 118–84 win over  Kentucky at the 
2018 Champions Classic. On January 12, 2019, Reddish scored 23 points on 9-of-15 shooting, including the game winner, against Florida State. On February 5, 2019, Reddish tallied 24 points and 4 rebounds in an 80–55 win over Boston College. On February 12, he scored 22 points in a 71-69 comeback victory against Louisville. On March 2, Reddish scored 19 points and 7 rebounds in an 87–57 victory against Miami. Reddish appeared in 36 total games for Duke and averaged 13.5 points, 3.7 rebounds and 1.9 assists while shooting 33% from three-point range. Reddish was named to the All-ACC Honorable Mention team.

On April 11, 2019, Reddish declared himself eligible for the 2019 NBA draft.

Professional career

Atlanta Hawks (2019–2022)
On June 20, 2019, Reddish was selected by the Atlanta Hawks with the 10th overall pick in the 2019 NBA draft. On July 1, 2019, Reddish officially signed with the Hawks. On October 24, 2019, Reddish made his NBA debut, started in a 117–100 win over the Detroit Pistons with one point, seven rebounds, an assist and a steal.

On December 22, 2021, Reddish scored a career-high 34 points in a 104–98 loss to the Orlando Magic.

New York Knicks (2022–2023)
On January 13, 2022, the Hawks traded Reddish, along with Solomon Hill, a 2025 second round draft pick and cash considerations, to the New York Knicks in exchange for future teammate Kevin Knox and a protected future first round pick. Reddish made his Knicks debut on January 23, 2022, logging two points and two rebounds in five minutes. On March 10, 2022 the New York Knicks announced that Reddish would miss the rest of the season due to a right shoulder injury.

Coming into the 2022–23 season, Knicks head coach Tom Thibodeau was unsure of the role Reddish would play in his rotation. After earning a few starts in the beginning of November, Thibodeau announced on December 6, 2022 that Reddish had fallen out of his nine-man rotation.

Portland Trail Blazers (2023–present) 
On February 9, 2023, Reddish was traded to the Portland Trail Blazers in a four-team trade involving the Charlotte Hornets and Philadelphia 76ers. He made his Trail Blazers debut the next day, recording 11 points, two rebounds and two assists in a 138–129 loss to the Oklahoma City Thunder.

Career statistics

NBA

Regular season

|-
| style="text-align:left;"|
| style="text-align:left;"|Atlanta
| 58 || 34 || 26.7 || .384 || .332 || .802 || 3.7 || 1.5 || 1.1 || .5 || 10.5
|-
| style="text-align:left;"|
| style="text-align:left;"|Atlanta
| 26 || 21 || 28.8 || .365 || .262 || .817 || 4.0 || 1.3 || 1.3 || .3 || 11.2
|-
| style="text-align:left;" rowspan="2"|
| style="text-align:left;"|Atlanta
| 34 || 7 || 23.4 || .402 || .379 || .900 || 2.5 || 1.1 || 1.0 || .3 || 11.9
|-
| style="text-align:left;"|New York
| 15 || 0 || 14.3 || .415 || .258 || .906 || 1.4 || .7 || .8 || .3 || 6.1
|-
| style="text-align:left;"|
| style="text-align:left;"|New York
| 20 || 8 || 21.9 || .449 || .304 || .879 || 1.6 || 1.0 || .8 || .4 || 8.4
|- class="sortbottom"
| style="text-align:center;" colspan="2"|Career
| 153 || 70 || 24.5 || .393 || .323 || .844 || 3.0 || 1.2 || 1.0 || .4 || 10.2

Playoffs

|-
| style="text-align:left;"|2021
| style="text-align:left;"|Atlanta
| 4 || 0 || 23.0 || .528 || .643 || .800 || 3.5 || 1.8 || 1.5 || .5 || 12.8
|- class="sortbottom"
| style="text-align:center;" colspan="2"|Career
| 4 || 0 || 23.0 || .528 || .643 || .800 || 3.5 || 1.8 || 1.5 || .5 || 12.8

College

|-
| style="text-align:left;"|2018–19
| style="text-align:left;"|Duke
| 36 || 35 || 29.7 || .356 || .333 || .772 || 3.7 || 1.9 || 1.6 || .6 || 13.5

Personal life
Reddish was born in Norristown, Pennsylvania to Zanthia and Robert Reddish. His father Robert played college basketball at VCU. Reddish has a younger brother, Aaron, who played high school basketball for Collin Sexton's former team, the Pebblebrook Falcons in Mableton, Georgia.

Reddish has hinted that he is an avid gamer, and especially loves Electronic Arts' UFC 4.

References

External links

 Duke Blue Devils bio

1999 births
Living people
21st-century African-American sportspeople
African-American basketball players
American men's basketball players
Atlanta Hawks draft picks
Atlanta Hawks players
Basketball players from Pennsylvania
Duke Blue Devils men's basketball players
McDonald's High School All-Americans
New York Knicks players
People from Norristown, Pennsylvania
Small forwards
Sportspeople from Montgomery County, Pennsylvania
Westtown School alumni